Indiscreet is a 1958 British romantic comedy film directed by Stanley Donen and starring Cary Grant and Ingrid Bergman.

The film is based on the play Kind Sir written by Norman Krasna. This was Grant's and Bergman's second film together, after Alfred Hitchcock's Notorious (1946), and was one of the first films to popularise artistic use of the technique of split screens. The film was remade for television in 1988 starring Robert Wagner and Lesley-Anne Down.

Plot 
Anna Kalman is an accomplished London-based theatre actress who has given up her hopes of finding the man of her dreams. Through her brother-in-law, Alfred Munson, she meets a handsome economist, Philip Adams. She is instantly captivated by him and expresses visible interest in him.

At the end of their first meeting, she makes a pass at him to go on a date sometime later to which he politely states that he is married. He further adds that he is separated and unable to get a divorce from his wife. Anna is seemingly unperturbed by the fact and still asks him out whereupon he agrees.

They hit it off on their first date and continue seeing each other frequently. Soon after, they fall in love. Anna is then cautioned by her sister Margaret about the affair but she rebuffs her approach.

As their romance continues to blossom, Philip receives a temporary transfer notice to New York for his work at NATO, which greatly distresses Anna as it will keep them apart for possibly five months.

On the day before Philip's scheduled sail, Alfred tells Philip that he knows Philip is a bachelor from Scotland Yard investigations and asks him the reason for this secret. Philip reveals that he is unenthusiastic about the idea of marriage but can't give up on women, which led him to develop this white lie. However, he assures Alfred that he sincerely loves Anna. He also tells that he plans to surprise Anna on her birthday the next day by delaying his departure by a few days and visiting her at midnight.

Anna informs Alfred and Margaret that she plans to go to New York to surprise Philip. To discourage her, Alfred unwillingly discloses Philip's plan. Margaret further worsens the situation by stating that Philip is actually unmarried. Anna becomes furious upon learning this, as she takes this as an insult to her dignity. She decides to go on as if nothing happened but secretly concocts a plan to get even with him.

She arranges an elaborate ruse where it will appear that she was having an affair with David, an old flame, when Philip comes to visit her at midnight on her birthday. But it does not go as planned when David meets with an accident and she is informed that he can't come. She tries to solve it by making her elderly caretaker Carl play the part of David. Despite this, her plan goes haywire when Philip comes and actually proposes marriage to her and leaves when he mistakes Carl for David. She is absolutely distraught by this, but luckily Philip returns and she is able to clear up the confusion. She tells him that she is happy the way things are. But now Philip is adamant about getting married and tells her so. Hearing this, Anna becomes extremely happy and the film ends with the couple embracing each other.

Main cast 
 Cary Grant - Philip Adams
 Ingrid Bergman - Anna Kalman
 Cecil Parker - Alfred Munson
 Phyllis Calvert - Margaret Munson
 David Kossoff - Carl Banks
 Megs Jenkins - Doris Banks

Production
No film studio sought the rights to the play Kind Sir, so Norman Krasna's co-producers - Joshua Logan, Mary Martin, and Charles Boyer - agreed to Krasna's offer to buy the rights himself for $10,000. Krasna did not tell his fellow producers he had lined up Cary Grant and Ingrid Bergman to star in a film.

In March 1955 United Artists announced Krasna would direct a film version for that studio. It was originally announced that the film would be made with either Marilyn Monroe or Jayne Mansfield, and with Clark Gable as the male star.

Krasna asked Stanley Donen if he wanted to direct while the latter was making Kiss Them for Me with Grant. Donen agreed "but only with Cary". Grant agreed but only if his co-star was Ingrid Bergman (the two had last acted together in Notorious [1946]). Bergman agreed provided the film could be shot in England, as she had a theatre commitment in Paris. Krasna agreed to make the changes from the play. Donen and Grant formed a company together, Grandon Productions, to make the film. In September 1957 Bergman announced she and Grant would star in the film for Warners.

Scenes in the Players' Club were filmed at the Garrick Club in London. The club agreed to let them film there but not to use their name.

Reception

Box office
The film ranked in the top 10 British box office hits in terms of gross profits in 1958. Kinematograph Weekly listed it as being "in the money" at the British box office in 1958. In North America it made $3.6 million.

It was popular and well reviewed. Logan saw the movie expecting to find it different from the play and was surprised to find it "verbatim" like Kind Sir. "Krasna's writing and my taste were more than vindicated," said Logan. "Had I been well [directing the play] it would have been another story."

Accolades
Indiscreet was nominated for three Golden Globes, two BAFTAs, and one Writers Guild of America award but failed to win any of them.

The film is recognized by American Film Institute in these lists:
 2002: AFI's 100 Years...100 Passions – Nominated

1988 television remake

The film was remade as a 1988 television movie. It was announced in March 1987 as a vehicle for Robert Wagner. Wagner pitched the idea to CBS because he loved the original. Lesley-Anne Down's casting was announced in February 1988. Filming was supposed to start in February 1988 but was pushed back to mid April. Filming finished by May.

The Chicago Tribune wrote: "Leslie-Anne [sic] Down obviously is no Bergman... Wagner is no Grant, try as he may.... "Indiscreet" is more flimsy than brittle, filled with lighter-than-air dialogue and the old hiding-out-on-window- ledges and falling-out-of-rowboat gambits. On the up side there is Down, who at times looks positively Ava Gardnerian, whether parading around in backless dresses or demonstrating a very special talent for saucily closing doors with her tush."

The Los Angeles Times said: "The vapidity of both [lead] performances is magnified by come-hither camera shots that linger too long on their empty faces... Down has a little more flounce to the ounce, but the best she can do as a woman deceived is to fly into a deep snit. Production values evoke the silky-bland noblesse oblige that has been canonized for TV by "Dynasty" and "Knots Landing"."

"Go out and rent the original on video cassette," said The New York Times.

References

Further reading

External links 
 
 
 
 
 
 Review of Broadway production at Variety
 1988 TV film at IMDb
 1988 TV Film at BFI

1958 films
1958 romantic comedy films
British romantic comedy films
Films shot at Associated British Studios
Warner Bros. films
British films based on plays
Films directed by Stanley Donen
Films scored by Richard Rodney Bennett
Films set in London
Films set in England
1950s English-language films
1950s British films